Like Water for Chocolate is a novel by Mexican novelist and screenwriter Laura Esquivel. It was first published in Mexico in 1989. The English version of the novel was published in 1992.

The novel follows the story of a young woman named Tita, who longs for her beloved, Pedro, but can never have him because of her mother's upholding of the family tradition: the youngest daughter cannot marry, but instead must take care of her mother until she dies. Tita is only able to express herself when she cooks.

Esquivel employs magical realism to combine the supernatural with the ordinary throughout the novel.

The novel won the American Booksellers Book of the Year Award for Adult Trade in 1994.

Plot
Like Water for Chocolate is divided into 12 chapters, one for each month of the year, and each chapter comes with a Mexican recipe that correlates to a specific event in the protagonist's life.

Tita de la Garza, the protagonist, is 15 years old at the beginning of the novel. She lives on a ranch near the Mexico-United States border with her domineering mother, Mama Elena, her older sisters Gertrudis and Rosaura; Nacha, the ranch cook; and Chencha, the ranch maid.

Pedro Muzquiz is their neighbor, with whom Tita falls in love at first sight at a family Christmas party. The feeling turns out to be mutual, so Pedro asks Mama Elena for Tita’s hand in marriage. Unfortunately, she forbids it, citing the de la Garza family tradition that the youngest daughter (in this case, Tita) must remain single and take care of her mother until she (Mama Elena) dies. She suggests that Pedro marry Tita's eldest sister, Rosaura, instead. In order to stay close to Tita, Pedro decides to follow this advice.

Tita has a deep connection with food and cooking thanks to Nacha, who was Tita's primary caretaker growing up. Her love for cooking also comes from the fact that she was born in the kitchen.

Mama Elena forces Tita to help Nacha prepare the meal for Rosaura's wedding reception. While preparing the wedding cake, Tita is overcome with sadness, and cries into the cake batter. At the wedding reception, everyone except for Tita gets violently sick after eating the wedding cake, vomiting everywhere. Suspecting that Tita put an emetic into the wedding cake, Mama Elena violently beats Tita. On the day of the wedding, Tita finds Nacha lying dead on her bed, holding a picture of her fiancé.

Later, Rosaura becomes pregnant and gives birth to a son, Roberto, which Tita delivers on her own. Rosaura is unable to nurse Roberto while recovering from pregnancy complications (eclampsia), so Tita brings a hungry Roberto to her breast to stop him from crying since he won't drink tea or cow's milk. Tita begins producing breast milk and is able to nurse Roberto. This brings her and Pedro closer than ever. They begin meeting secretly around the ranch behind the family's backs.

Tita pours her intense emotions into her cooking, unintentionally affecting those around her. After Tita makes quail in rose petal sauce for dinner one evening (flavored with Tita’s erotic thoughts of Pedro), Gertrudis becomes so inflamed with lust that she sweats pink, rose-scented sweat; when she goes to cool off in the shower, her body gives off so much heat that the shower's tank water evaporates before reaching her body and the shower itself catches fire. As Gertrudis runs out of the burning shower naked, she is carried away on horseback by revolutionary captain Juan Alejandrez, who is drawn to her from the battlefield by her rosy scent; they make love atop Juan's horse as they gallop away from the ranch. Gertrudis is later revealed to be working as a prostitute in a brothel on the border and is subsequently disowned by her mother.

Rosaura, Pedro and Roberto are forced to move to San Antonio at Mama Elena's insistence, who suspects a relationship between Tita and Pedro. Roberto dies soon after the move and Rosaura later must undergo a hysterectomy due to complications occurring during the birth of her daughter, Esperanza. Upon hearing of her nephew's death, Tita, who cared for Roberto herself, blames her mother, who responds by smacking Tita across the face with a wooden spoon, thus breaking her nose. Tita, destroyed by the death of her nephew and unwilling to further cope with her mother's controlling ways, secludes herself in the dovecote until John Brown, the widowed family doctor, arrives at Mama Elena's request to have him take Tita to an insane asylum. Instead, John takes Tita back to his home to live with him and his young son, Alex.

Tita and John soon fall in love, and are eventually engaged to be married, but her underlying feelings for Pedro do not waver. While John travels to the United States to retrieve his aunt Mary for the wedding, Tita loses her virginity to Pedro. A month later, Tita is worried she may be pregnant with Pedro’s child.  Her mother's ghost haunts her, telling her that she and her unborn child are cursed. Gertrudis, now married to Juan Alejandrez and a general in the army, returns to the ranch with her troops to cut the Three Kings' Day bread and mentions Tita's pregnancy in Pedro's presence, leaving Tita and Pedro to consider running away together. This causes Pedro to get drunk and sing a love song below Tita’s window while she is arguing with Mama Elena’s ghost. Just as she confirms she isn't pregnant (due to a late period) and frees herself of her mother's grasp once and for all, Mama Elena's ghost gets revenge on Tita by setting Pedro on fire, leaving him badly burnt and bedridden. Meanwhile, as Tita is preparing dinner for John and his aunt Mary, she and Rosaura argue over Pedro, Esperanza, and Rosaura's intention to have Esperanza remain single and care for Rosaura until her death, per the family tradition, which Tita detests. She vows not to let the tradition ruin Esperanza's life as it did hers. At dinner, Tita tells John that she cannot marry him because of her affair with Pedro.

Many years later, John's son Alex and Esperanza are engaged, and Tita prepares for their wedding, after Rosaura has died from digestive problems. During the wedding, Pedro proposes to Tita saying that he does not want to “die without making [Tita] [his] wife”. Tita accepts and Pedro dies making love to her in the kitchen storage room right after the wedding. Tita is overcome with sorrow and cold and begins to eat a box of candles. The candles are sparked by the heat of Pedro's memory, creating a spectacular fire that engulfs them both, eventually consuming the entire ranch.

The narrator of the story is Esperanza's daughter, nicknamed Tita after her great-aunt. She describes how, after the fire, the only thing that survived under the smoldering rubble of the ranch was Tita's cookbook, which contained all the recipes described in the preceding chapters.

Characters
 Josefita (Tita) de la Garza, the novel's protagonist; a talented cook and Pedro Muzquiz's sweetheart.
 Pedro Muzquiz, Tita's sweetheart, who marries Rosaura to be closer to Tita.
 Elena de la Garza (Mama Elena), the novel's antagonist; Tita's widowed, domineering mother.
 Gertrudis de la Garza, Tita's older sister, Mama Elena's middle (and illegitimate) daughter.
 Rosaura de la Garza, Tita's eldest sister, Mama Elena's eldest daughter.
 Dr. John Brown, the widowed family doctor who falls in love with Tita. Their engagement ends after Tita loses her virginity to Pedro.
 Nacha, the ranch cook, who is more of a mother to Tita than Mama Elena.
 Chencha, the ranch maid.
 Roberto Muzquiz, Pedro and Rosaura's infant son. He later dies from something he ate.
 Esperanza Muzquiz, Pedro and Rosaura's daughter, Alex Brown's wife. She is also the mother of the narrator.
 Alex Brown, John Brown's son who later marries Esperanza.
 Nicholas, the manager of the ranch.
 Juan Alejandrez, the revolutionary captain who carries Gertrudis away and eventually marries her.
 Jesús Martinez, Chencha's first love. They reunite after many years apart and get married.

Themes

Self-growth
At the beginning of the novel, Tita has been a generally submissive young lady. As the novel progresses, Tita learns to disobey the injustice of her mother, and gradually becomes more and more adept at expressing her inner fire through various means. Cooking through enlightenment she learned to express her feelings, and cope with her mother.

Violence
Mama Elena often resorts to violence as she forces Tita to obey her. Many of the responsibilities she imposes on Tita, especially those relating to Pedro and Rosaura's wedding, are blatant acts of cruelty, given Tita's pain over losing Pedro. Mama Elena meets Tita's slightest protest with angry tirades and beatings. If she even suspects that Tita has not fulfilled her duties, she beats her.  One example is when she thought that Tita intentionally ruined the wedding cake. When Tita dares to stand up to her mother, blaming her for Roberto's death, Mama Elena smacks her across the face, breaking her nose.  Since Mama Elena must protect herself and her family from bandits and revolutionaries, her cruelty could be interpreted for strength. Then again, Tita's later illusions indicate that Mama Elena's actions were far from typical and deeply scarred Tita.

Passion
The romantic love that is so exalted throughout the novel is forbidden by Tita's mother in order to blindly enforce the tradition that the youngest daughter be her mother's chaste guardian. However, the traditional etiquette enforced by Mama Elena is defied progressively throughout the novel. This parallels the setting of the Mexican Revolution growing in intensity. The novel further parallels the Mexican Revolution because during the Mexican Revolution the power of the country was in the hands of a select few and the people had no power to express their opinions. Likewise, in Like Water for Chocolate, Mama Elena represents the select few who had the power in their hands, while Tita represents the people because she had no power to express her opinions but had to obey her mother's rules.

Rebellion
Tita is born in the kitchen—a place that foreshadows her calling. Due to the tradition that requires the youngest daughter to care for her mother, Mama Elena forbids Tita from falling in love, marrying, or becoming pregnant, forcing her to work in the kitchen. As she becomes a young woman, Tita appears to conform to the gender role her mother expects; however, Tita rebels, creatively devising a way in which she can express her suppressed feelings and emotions through her cooking. She has the magical ability to send her desires and emotions into the food she prepares. Tita bakes the wedding cake for her sister Rosaura and the man she wishes she was marrying, Pedro. Deeply depressed about the fact that her sister is marrying her one true love, she places her feelings of despair and sadness into the wedding cake. When the guests eat the cake, they weep over their lost loves and eventually became intoxicated and sick. Another example of her inclusion of suppressed emotions into her cooking is when Tita’s blood infects the rose sauce and quail dinner that she serves to Pedro, Rosaura, and Gertrudis. Rosaura becomes physically ill while Getrudis is instantly aroused. Finally, as a result of Pedro devouring this food, he becomes aware of Tita’s feelings and has a better understanding of the passion and love that she has for him. Even though Tita is not allowed to share her intimate feelings, she conveys her passions to the world through the action of cooking and sharing her food.

Food

Food is also one of the major themes in the story which is seen throughout the story. It is used very creatively to represent the characters' feelings and situations. Due to the magical nature of food in the story, it has literal effects on the people eating the food in terms of infusing the cook Tita's emotions into the food which are thus transferred beyond the food into the hearts and minds of those who devour it.

Meaning of title
Like Water for Chocolates full title is: Like Water for Chocolate: A novel in monthly installments with recipes, romances and home remedies.

The phrase "like water for chocolate" comes from the Spanish phrase como agua para chocolate. This is a common expression in many Spanish-speaking countries, and it means that one's emotions are on the verge of boiling over. In some Latin American countries, such as Mexico, hot chocolate is made not with milk, but with near-boiling water instead.

Publication history
Like Water for Chocolate has been translated from the original Spanish into numerous languages; the English translation is by Carol and Thomas Christensen. The novel has sold close to a million copies in Spain and Hispanic America and at last count, in 1993, more than 202,000 copies in the United States.

Tita's Diary 

In 2016, a second part was released for Like Water for Chocolate. The novel is titled Tita's Diary, and it is meant to provide insight into the main character during the original story. In these pages we delve into the intimate universe of Tita de la Garza through her diary, from the unforgettable moment in which she discovers love, to the day she must renounce it to take care of her mother due to an ancient family tradition. This painful event, far from confining her to solitude and silence, will lead her to find her two ways of expression: through writing dialogues with herself and through cooking. These are the ways she communicates with the world and others. Tita's diary is the space where the protagonist treasures her most intricate secrets, unprepared recipes, memories that almost fade; It is the sacred site where all the ingredients of a great novel are mixed together with the characteristic spiritual sparkles of the author. This story manages to give us a secret that in turn will allow us to regain our own privacy and, why not, our own secret kept at the bottom of a withered flower or a letter that, after generations, hopes to surprise its regular reader. Its chapters feature recipes like: 

 Buñuelos
 Christmas cakes
 Quail in rose petals
 Northern chorizo
 Dill pickles 

"I'll walk away from you, but I won't leave you. I stay in the water and in the wind, in the amber of sunset. I walk away from you, but remember that I never, never leave you" - Tita

Adaptations 
The novel was made into film of the same name, Like Water for Chocolate, by Alfonso Arau in 1992. The ballet version was created by Christopher Wheeldon and Joby Talbot in 2022.

References

External links
 Sparknotes study guide
 Laura Esquivel website via Simon & Schuster
  Like Water for Chocolate on Google Books

1989 novels
Mexican magic realism novels
Mexican novels adapted into films
Novels set in Mexico
Novels set in the Mexican Revolution
Doubleday (publisher) books
1989 debut novels